Matteo Delpodio (born 23 June 1985) is an Italian professional golfer.

Delpodio was born in Turin, Italy. In amateur golf, he won several national championships before turning professional in 2006.

Delpodio played on the Alps Tour from 2007 to 2010. He won three tournaments and the Order of Merit in 2010. This earned him a spot on the Challenge Tour for 2011.

Delpodio played the Challenge Tour in 2009, 2011–12, 2014–15. He picked up his first win at the 2015 EMC Challenge Open.

Delpodio played the European Tour in 2013 after successfully completing Qualifying School. His best finish was T-8 at the Open de España.

Amateur wins
2003 Italian Amateur Match Play Championship, Italian Junior Championship 
2005 Italian Amateur Foursome Championship 
2006 Italian Amateur Match Play Championship

Professional wins (5)

Challenge Tour wins (1)

Alps Tour wins (4)

Team appearances
Amateur
Junior Ryder Cup (representing Europe): 2002 (winners) 
Jacques Léglise Trophy (representing the Continent of Europe): 2003 
Eisenhower Trophy (representing Italy): 2004, 2006 
European Amateur Team Championship (representing Italy): 2005
European Youths' Team Championship (representing Italy): 2006
St Andrews Trophy (representing the Continent of Europe): 2006

See also
2012 European Tour Qualifying School graduates

References

External links

Italian male golfers
European Tour golfers
Sportspeople from Turin
1985 births
Living people